One Little Independent Records (formerly One Little Indian Records) is an English independent record label. It was set up in 1985 by members of various anarcho-punk bands, and managed by former Flux of Pink Indians bassist Derek Birkett. In the 1990s it set up a number of subsidiary labels.

History 
One Little Indian Records was founded in 1985 by members of various anarcho-punk bands, and managed by former Flux of Pink Indians bassist Derek Birkett, with the name inspired by the "philosophies of the Indigenous People of the Americas".

The label's first success came with A.R. Kane and Flux of Pink Indians in 1986. Success continued with Alabama 3, Björk, Chumbawamba, Kitchens of Distinction, The Shamen, Skunk Anansie, Sneaker Pimps, and the Sugarcubes.

Beginning in 1990, the label created several autonomous satellite imprints including Clean-up Records, Partisan Records and Fat Cat Records, all of which had success. Artists on the labels included Alabama 3 (A3), Sigur Rós, and Sneaker Pimps. Elemental Records was added to the roster in 1995.

The song titles of The Shamen's 1996 album Hempton Manor form an acrostic, spelling out "Fuck Birket" in an acrimonious reference to founder Birkett, who wanted the group to move back into more commercial territory.

In 1997 and 2001, the company also acquired some of the old Rough Trade Records and Nude Records labels, and the rights to several albums previously released by spinART Records.

In 2009, Paul McCartney, along with Youth, released an album called Electric Arguments under the name of The Fireman through One Little Indian.

In June 2020, in response to worldwide protests following the murder of George Floyd, it was announced that the company's name would be changed from One Little Indian Records to One Little Independent Records with immediate effect, and that the company would donate money towards organisations which promote and assist Native American communities in North America. In a written statement, Birkett explained:The last few weeks have been a monumental learning curve ... Following the receipt of an eye-opening letter from a Crass fan that detailed precisely why the logo and label name are offensive, as well as the violent history of the terminology, I felt equally appalled and grateful to them for making me understand what must be changed.

Notable artists 
 Ásgeir
 Olga Bell
 Galya Bisengalieva
 Björk
 Cody Chesnutt
 Manu Delago
 Foxtrott 
 Fufanu
 God Damn
 Jesse Malin
 Sarasara
 Samaris
 Emilíana Torrini
 Marry Waterson
 Wild Palms
 Kathryn Williams

Reception 
Amazing Radio has characterised the label as "consistently brilliant" and as having "a rich musical history".

See also 
 List of independent UK record labels
 List of record labels
 Spiderleg Records

References

External links 
 Official UK & EU website

 
Punk record labels
British independent record labels
Record labels established in 1985
1985 establishments in England
Name changes due to the George Floyd protests